Development Cabinet may refer to the following cabinets of the Indonesian government:
 First Development Cabinet
 Second Development Cabinet
 Third Development Cabinet
 Fourth Development Cabinet
 Fifth Development Cabinet
 Sixth Development Cabinet
 Seventh Development Cabinet